Terry or Terence  Lewis may refer to:

Terry Lewis (police officer) (born 1928), former Queensland police commissioner who was convicted and jailed for corruption
Terry Lewis (politician) (born 1935), British politician
Terry Lewis (judge), Florida judge who oversaw the 2000 US presidential election recount
Terry Lewis (footballer) (1937–1975), Australian rules footballer
Terence Lewis (choreographer) (born 1975), Indian dancer and choreographer
Terry Lewis, member of American R&B and pop songwriting team Jimmy Jam and Terry Lewis
Terry Lewis, guitarist with British soul band Mamas Gun